Tatenberg is a quarter in Hamburg, Germany, in the borough of Bergedorf. In 2020 the population was 564.

Geography
Tatenberg borders the quarters Spadenland, Ochsenwerder, Moorfleet, Rothenburgsort and Allermöhe. It is located at the Dove Elbe.

Politics
These are the results of Tatenberg in the Hamburg state election:

Tatenberg and Spadenland were the only quarters where the CDU won the majority of the votes in the Hamburg state election in 2011. However the CDU also lost these two quarters in the Hamburg state election in 2015 and the SPD became the most popular party in these quarters as well.

Transport
Tatenberg has no S-Bahn or U-Bahn station but four different bus lines.

References

Quarters of Hamburg
Bergedorf